"Ayy Ladies" is a song by American hip hop group Travis Porter featuring American rapper Tyga. It was first released on September 29, 2011 from Travis Porter's mixtape Differenter 3, before being released on January 27, 2012 as the third single from their debut studio album From Day 1 (2012).

Music video
The music video was directed by Alex Nazari, and sees Travis Porter roaming the halls of a hotel surrounded by beautiful women. The video also features cameos from Chris Brown and Meek Mill.

Controversy
In October 2016, Travis Porter was sued by singer Jasmine Usher, who can be heard saying "Yeah" repeatedly in the song. Usher stated she was never paid, asking for royalties and a portion of future profits.

Charts

Certifications

References

2012 singles
Travis Porter songs
Tyga songs
2011 songs
Songs written by Tyga
Songs written by FKi 1st